Players vs. ángeles caídos is a 1969 Argentinian film.

Cast

External links
 

1969 films
Argentine drama films
1960s Spanish-language films
1960s Argentine films